West Hempstead High School is a public high school located in West Hempstead, Nassau County, New York, U.S.A., and is the only high school operated by the West Hempstead Union Free School District.

As of the 2014–15 school year, the school had an enrollment of 798 students and 47.4 classroom teachers (on an FTE basis), for a student–teacher ratio of 16.8:1. There were 248 students (31.1% of enrollment) eligible for free lunch and 58 (7.3% of students) eligible for reduced-cost lunch.

Footnotes

Schools in Nassau County, New York
Public high schools in New York (state)